Shingo Morita may refer to:
 Shingo Morita (footballer, born 1978) (森田 真吾), Japanese footballer
 Shingo Morita (footballer, born 2001) (森田 慎吾), Japanese footballer